Cornejo is a Spanish surname meaning someone who lived by a Dogwood tree or who lived in one of several places called Cornejo. It may refer to:

Aldo Cornejo (born 1955), Chilean politician
Alfredo Cornejo (boxer) (born 1933), Chilean boxer
Alfredo Cornejo (politician) (born 1962), Argentine politician
Antonio Cornejo Polar (1936–1997), Peruvian-born academic, teacher, literature and cultural critic
Cristina Cornejo (politician) (born 1982), Salvadoran politician and feminist activist
Cristina Cornejo (weightlifter) (born 1985), Peruvian weightlifter
Cristina Kotz Cornejo, Argentine-American director and screenwriter
Diego Borja Cornejo or Diego Borja, Ecuadorian economist and politician
Eduardo Cornejo, Chilean boxer
Enrique Cornejo (born 1956), Peruvian politician
Erica Cornejo (born 1978/79), Argentine ballet dancer, sister of Herman Cornejo
Fernanda Cornejo (born 1989), Ecuadorian fashion model and beauty queen
Fernando Cornejo (1969–2009), Chilean footballer
Fernando Cornejo Miranda (born 1995), Chilean footballer, son of Fernando Cornejo
Francisco Cornejo (1892–1963), Mexican painter and sculptor specializing in Maya and Aztec themes
Francisco Javier Cornejo (1669–1750), Spanish military commander of the Spanish navy
Gerardo Cornejo Murrieta (born 1937), Mexican writer
German Cornejo & Gisela Galeassi, Argentinian Tango dance duo
Guillermo Cornejo (1919–1990), Peruvian sports shooter
Héctor Cornejo Chávez (1918–2012), Peruvian politician, jurist and writer
Herman Cornejo (born 1981), Argentine ballet dancer, brother of Erica Cornejo
Jorge Ledezma Cornejo (born 1963), Bolivian lawyer and politician
José María Cornejo (1788–1864), Salvadoran politician
Juan Cornejo (born 1990), Chilean footballer
Karla Cornejo Villavicencio (born 1989), Ecuadorian-American writer
Libiri Cornejo (born 2001), Mexican-American
Luciano Cornejo Barrera (born 1959), Mexican politician
Mardie Cornejo (born 1951), Major League Baseball relief pitcher
Maria Cornejo, Chilean-American fashion designer
Maricela Cornejo (born 1987), American boxer
Marlón Cornejo (born 1993), Salvadoran footballer
Miguel R. Cornejo (1888–1984), Mayor of the City of Pasay, Philippines
Nate Cornejo (born 1979), American baseball player
Oscar Roberto Cornejo (born 1983), Argentine footballer
Patricio Cornejo (June 6, 1944), Chilean tennis player
Pedro Cornejo de Pedrosa (1536–1618), Spanish Carmelite, theologian, professor of the University of Salamanca
Pedro Duque y Cornejo (1677–1757), Spanish Baroque painter and sculptor of the Sevillian school of sculpture
René Cornejo (born 1962), Peruvian politician
Robert Cornejo (born 1983), American politician (R-MO)
Rosa Elena Cornejo Pazmiño (1874–1964), Ecuadorian Roman Catholic nun, known as María Francisca of the Wounds
Wendy Cornejo (born 1993), Bolivian racewalker

See also
8447 Cornejo (provisional designation: 1974 OE) is a main-belt minor planet
Coronel Cornejo, town and municipality in Salta Province in northwestern Argentina
Sastreria Cornejo, company that specialises in costumes for film, television and theater
Cornedo (disambiguation)
Cornelio (disambiguation)
Cornetto (disambiguation)
Coroneo

References